Three Days to Live is a 1957 French crime film directed by Gilles Grangier and starring Daniel Gélin, Jeanne Moreau and Lino Ventura. It was shot at the Saint-Maurice Studios in Paris and on location in Le Havre and Rouen. The film's sets were designed by the art director Roger Briaucourt. It premiered at the Cannes Film Festival in August 1957.

Synopsis
An actor, struggling as a part of a company touring the provinces, identifies the suspect in a murder case and becomes an overnight sensation. However the man he has accused escapes and now threatens him.

Cast
 Daniel Gélin as Simon Belin 
 Jeanne Moreau as Jeanne Fortin 
 Lino Ventura as Lino Ferrari 
 Georges Flamant as Inspector Segalier 
 Albert Augier as Dédé 
 Aimé Clariond as Charlie Bianchi 
 Roland Armontel as Alexandre Bérimont 
 Joëlle Bernard as Mauricette 
 Moustache as Davros 
 Robert Rollis as Lucien Morisot 
 Evelyne Rey as Bélina 
 Jannick Arvel as Thérese 
 Jacques Marin as Le gendarme 
 Jean Toulout as Président des Assises  
 Jean-Marie Rivière as Un comédien 
 Jo Peignot as Patron du café 
 Jean Degrave as Réceptionniste de l'hôtel 
 Marcel Pérès as Propriétaire du thêatre 
 José Quaglio as Un acteur 
 François Joux as Secrétaire du commissaire

References

Bibliography 
 Goble, Alan. The Complete Index to Literary Sources in Film. Walter de Gruyter, 1999.

External links 
 

1957 films
1957 crime films
French crime films
1950s French-language films
Films directed by Pierre Colombier
Films scored by Joseph Kosma
Films with screenplays by Michel Audiard
1950s French films